IBM x series may refer to:

IBM ThinkPad X series — laptop line (2000–2005, later Lenovo ThinkPad X series)
IBM eServer xSeries — server line (2000-2004)

See also
 Xseries (disambiguation)